The canton of Ensisheim is an administrative division of the Haut-Rhin department, northeastern France. Its borders were modified at the French canton reorganisation which came into effect in March 2015. Its seat is in Ensisheim.

It consists of the following communes:

Algolsheim
Appenwihr
Artzenheim
Balgau
Baltzenheim
Biesheim
Biltzheim
Blodelsheim
Dessenheim
Durrenentzen
Ensisheim
Fessenheim
Geiswasser
Heiteren
Hettenschlag
Hirtzfelden
Kunheim
Logelheim
Meyenheim
Munchhouse
Munwiller
Nambsheim
Neuf-Brisach
Niederentzen
Niederhergheim
Oberentzen
Oberhergheim
Obersaasheim
Réguisheim
Roggenhouse
Rumersheim-le-Haut
Rustenhart
Urschenheim
Vogelgrun
Volgelsheim
Weckolsheim
Widensolen
Wolfgantzen

References

Cantons of Haut-Rhin